Cacho may refer to:

Dice Games
Cacho Alalay, a South American dice game popular in Bolivia
Dudo, a South American dice game popular in Chile, also known as Pico or Perudo

Geology
Cacho Formation, a geological formation in the Colombian Andes